Sleater-Kinney is the debut studio album by the American rock band Sleater-Kinney, released in 1995 by Chainsaw Records. The album received favorable reviews from critics.

Recording and release
Sleater-Kinney was recorded by Nick Carrol at 486 Victoria Street in Melbourne, Australia and produced by Tim Green and the band at the Red House in Olympia, Washington. The album was released in 1995 by the queercore independent record label Chainsaw Records. As of March 1996, the album had sold 1,000 copies according to singer and guitarist Corin Tucker. As of February 2015, Sleater-Kinney has sold 25,000 copies in the U.S. according to Nielsen SoundScan.

Critical reception

Sleater-Kinney received favorable reviews from music critics. AllMusic reviewer Zach Curd stated that the album "is a medium-fi blast of thrashy riot grrrl rock. Some tracks are reminiscent of [1990s] Sonic Youth ('Be Yr Mama'), while others are just blasts of punk angst ('A Real Man'). The group suffers from excessively monotone melody lines, but succeeds with their overall confidence and an understanding of dynamics that is promising". In a more positive review, prominent music critic Robert Christgau commented, "while their same-sex one-on-ones aren't exactly odes to joy, they convey a depth of feeling that could pass for passion."

Track listing

Personnel
Corin Tucker – vocals, guitar
Carrie Brownstein (listed as "Carrie Kinney" on the album) – guitar, vocals on 2, 5 10
Lora Macfarlane – Drums, vocals and guitar on 9

References

External links

1995 debut albums
Sleater-Kinney albums
Matador Records albums
Sub Pop albums